The University of Pamplona, is a public, departmental, coeducational research university based primarily in the city of Pamplona, Norte de Santander, Colombia.  The university also has two satellite campuses in the department, in the cities of Cúcuta and Villa del Rosario.

See also 

 List of universities in Colombia
 Department of Medicine – University of Pamplona

Notes

External links 
 University of Pamplona official site 

Universities and colleges in Colombia
Educational institutions established in 1960
Buildings and structures in Norte de Santander Department
1960 establishments in Colombia